Methoxyamine is the organic compound with the formula CH3ONH2.  Also called O-methylhydroxylamine, it is a colourless volatile liquid that is soluble in polar organic solvent and in water. It is a derivative of hydroxylamine with the hydroxyl hydrogen replaced by a methyl group. Alternatively, it can be viewed as a derivative of methanol with the hydroxyl hydrogen replaced by an amino group. It is an isomer of N-methylhydroxylamine and aminomethanol. It decomposes in an exothermic reaction (-56 kJ/mol) to methane and azanone unless stored as a hydrochloride salt.

Synthesis
Methoxyamine is prepared via O-alkylation of hydroxylamine derivatives.  For example, it is obtained by O-methylation of acetone oxime followed by hydrolysis of the O-methylated oxime:
(CH3)2CNOCH3   +  H2O   →   (CH3)2CO  +  H2NOCH3

The other broad method involves methanolysis of hydroxylamine sulfonates: 
H2NOSO3−   +  CH3OH   →  H2NOCH3  +  HSO4−

Reactions
Analogous to the behavior of hydroxylamine, methoxyamine condenses with ketones and aldehydes to give imines.

Methoxyamine is used as a synthon for NH2+.  It undergoes deprotonation by methyl lithium to give CH3ONHLi.  This N-lithio derivative is attacked by organolithium compounds to give, after hydrolysis, amines:
 H2NOCH3  +  CH3Li   →    LiHNOCH3  +  CH4
 LiHNOCH3  +  RLi   →    RNHLi  +  LiOCH3
 RNHLi  +  H2O   →   RNH2  +  LiOH

Uses
Methoxyamine has potential medicinal uses. It covalently binds to apurinic/apyrimidinic (AP) DNA damage sites and inhibits base excision repair (BER), which may result in an increase in DNA strand breaks and apoptosis.This agent may potentiate the anti-tumor activity of alkylating agents. Methoxyamine 

Examples of drugs incorporating the methoxyamine unit are brasofensine and gemifloxacin.

References

External links
 Sigma-Aldrich Methoxyamine Hydrochloride

Hydroxylamines